Helicopter Mom is a 2014 American comedy film directed by Salomé Breziner and starring Nia Vardalos.

The overbearing mother (Nia Vardalos) of a sexually undecided teenager (Jason Dolley) tells everyone that he's gay to submit an application on his behalf for a college scholarship for LGBT students.

Cast
Nia Vardalos as Maggie
Jason Dolley as Lloyd
Mark Boone Junior as Max
Kate Flannery as Norma
Scott Shilstone as Brad
Skyler Samuels as Carrie

Reception
The film has a 29% rating on Rotten Tomatoes, based on 7 critical reviews. Sandie Angulo Chen of Common Sense Media gave the film two stars out of five.

References

External links
 
 

2014 films
American comedy films
2014 LGBT-related films
American LGBT-related films
LGBT-related comedy films
Films directed by Salomé Breziner
2010s English-language films
2010s American films